Richard Cotton is the executive director of the Port Authority of New York and New Jersey. He assumed this role in 2017.

Early life and education 
Cotton was born in 1945 or 1946 in the Hyde Park neighborhood of Chicago. His mother, Sylvia Cotton, founded Illinois Action for Children, a nonprofit that focuses on ensuring all children, especially those facing poverty and racial injustice, have access the high-quality child care and early education they need to succeed in school and in life. His father, Eugene Cotton, served as a labor lawyer. Cotton has a BA from Harvard University and a JD from Yale Law School.

Career 
Cotton served as Supreme Court Associate Justice William J. Brennan Jr.'s clerk during 1970–1971. He served as NBCUniversal's general counsel and New York governor Andrew Cuomo's "transportation czar" prior to becoming the Port Authority's executive director.

Cotton has advocated for a new air train running from Flushing to La Guardia. He has called this a one stop from downtown to the airport. Critiques have noted the transfers and distance involved to dispute this. This project has been viewed as an Andrew Cuomo vanity project that does not realize its intended purpose.

At the outbreak of the pandemic, when testing was scarce for Port Authority employees, Andrew Cuomo helped Cotton receive a Covid-19 test along with other executives, like Pat Foye and Cuomo family members.

Personal life
Cotton married Elizabeth W. Smith, the Assistant Commissioner of New York City Department of Parks and Recreation, in 2011.

On March 9, 2020, New York governor Andrew Cuomo announced that Cotton had been infected by SARS-CoV-2, the virus that causes coronavirus disease 2019. His wife also tested positive for the virus, and the couple were reported to have self-quarantined in their home. Cuomo reported on March 22 that Cotton had recovered from SARS-CoV-2 without having been hospitalized.

References

1940s births
Living people
Harvard University alumni
People from Chicago
Port Authority of New York and New Jersey people
Yale Law School alumni
Law clerks of the Supreme Court of the United States
NBCUniversal people